Men's Downhill World Cup 1987/1988

Final point standings

In Men's Downhill World Cup 1987/88 all results count.

References
 fis-ski.com

External links
 

World Cup
FIS Alpine Ski World Cup men's downhill discipline titles